Nikolay Kostov (born 9 September 1986) is a Bulgarian footballer, who currently plays for Neftochimic Burgas as a defender.

References

External links 
 

1986 births
Living people
Bulgarian footballers
PFC Chernomorets Burgas players
Neftochimic Burgas players
PFC Nesebar players
FC Vereya players
First Professional Football League (Bulgaria) players
Association football defenders